Camilla Ceder (born 1976) is a Swedish writer specializing in crime fiction.

She studied social science and psychotherapy and worked as a counsellor and social worker. She lives in Gothenburg, the setting for her novels.

Selected works 
 Fruset ögonblick (2008), translated as Frozen moment (2010)
 Babylon (2010), translated in 2012

References 

1976 births
Living people
Swedish crime fiction writers
Swedish women novelists
Place of birth missing (living people)
Writers from Gothenburg